Islam in Christmas Island is the island's second largest religion, following Buddhism, and is primarily practised by the island's ethnic Malay population; the island has no current indigenous population.

The Muslim population is estimated at 25% (1997) of an overall population of 1,496 (2010), by the CIA World Factbook.

The Australian Federation of Islamic Councils includes a council for each state, as well as Australian Capital Territory, Northern Territory, and Christmas Island.

The town of Katanning, Western Australia, has a large population of Christmas Island Muslims.

References

 
Christmas